The 2010–11 UTEP Miners men's basketball team represented the University of Texas at El Paso in the 2010–11 NCAA Division I men's basketball season. The Miners, led by head coach Tim Floyd, played their home games at the Don Haskins Center in El Paso, Texas, as members of Conference USA. The Miners finished in a tie for 2nd in Conference USA, eventually advancing to the championship game of the Conference USA tournament, where they were defeated by Memphis.

UTEP failed to qualify for the NCAA tournament, but were given an at-large bid to the 2011 NIT. The Miners were eliminated in the first round of the NIT by New Mexico, 69–57.

Roster 

Source

Schedule and results

|-
!colspan=12 style=|Exhibition

|-
!colspan=12 style=|Regular season

|-
!colspan=12 style=| Conference USA Tournament

|-
!colspan=12 style=| NIT

Source

References

UTEP Miners men's basketball seasons
UTEP
UTEP
UTEP Miners men's basketball
UTEP Miners men's basketball